This list of ancient Iranian peoples includes the names of Indo-European peoples speaking Iranian languages or otherwise considered Iranian ethnically or linguistically in sources from the late 1st millennium BC to the early 2nd millennium AD.

Background 

Ancient and modern Iranian peoples mostly descend from the Proto-Indo-Iranians, common ancestors respectively of the Proto-Iranians and Proto-Indo-Aryans, this people possibly was the same of the Sintashta-Petrovka culture. Proto-Iranians separated from the Proto-Indo-Aryans early in the 2nd-millennium BCE. These peoples probably called themselves by the name "Aryans", which was the basis for several ethnonyms of Iranian and Indo-Aryan peoples or for the entire group of peoples which shares kin and similar cultures.

Iranian peoples first appear in Assyrian records in the 9th century BCE. In Classical Antiquity, they were found primarily in Scythia (in Central Asia, Eastern Europe, the Balkans and the Northern Caucasus) and Persia (in Western Asia). They divided into "Western" and "Eastern" branches from an early period, roughly corresponding to the territories of Persia and Scythia, respectively. By the 1st millennium BCE, Medes, Persians, Bactrians and Parthians populated the Iranian plateau, while others such as the Scythians, Sarmatians, Cimmerians and Alans populated the steppes north of the Black Sea and the Caspian Sea, as far as the Great Hungarian Plain in the west. The Saka tribes remained mainly in the far-east, eventually spreading as far east as the Ordos Desert.

Ancient Iranian peoples spoke languages that were the ancestors of modern Iranian languages, these languages form a sub-branch of the Indo-Iranian sub-family, which is a branch of the family of the wider Indo-European languages.

Ancient Iranian peoples lived in many regions and, at about 200 BC, they had as farthest geographical points dwelt by them: to the west the Great Hungarian Plain (Alföld), east of the Danube river (where they formed an enclave of Iranian peoples), Ponto-Caspian steppe in today's southern Ukraine, Russia and far western Kazakhstan, and to the east the Altay Mountains western and northwestern foothills and slopes and also western Gansu, Ordos Desert, and western Inner Mongolia, in northwestern China(Xinjiang), to the north southern West Siberia and southern Ural Mountains (Riphean Mountains?) and to the south the northern coasts of the Persian Gulf and the Arabian Sea. The geographical area dwelt by ancient Iranian peoples was therefore vast (at the end of the 1st Millennium BC they dwelt in an area of several million square kilometers or miles thus roughly corresponding to half or slightly less than half of the geographical area that all Indo-European peoples dwelt in Eurasia).

During Late Antiquity, in a process that lasted until Middle Age, the Iranian populations of Scythia and Sarmatia, in the western (Ponto-Caspian) and central (Kazakh) Eurasian Steppe and most of Central Asia (that once formed a large geographic area dwelt by Iranian peoples), started to be conquered by other non-Iranian peoples and began to be marginalized, assimilated or expelled mainly as result of the Turkic peoples conquests and migrations that resulted in the Turkification of the remaining Iranian ethnic groups in Central Asia and the western Eurasian steppe (by the Xiongnu, the Huns and Hunnic Empire, Göktürks and Göktürk Empire, Oghuz Turks, etc). Germanic (Goths), Slavic (like the Kievan Rus) and later Mongolian (Mongol Empire) conquests and migrations also contributed to the decline of the Iranian peoples in these regions. By the 10th century, the Eastern Iranian languages were no longer spoken in many of the territories they were once spoken, with the exception of Pashto in Central Asia, Ossetic in the Northern Caucasus and Pamiri languages in Badakhshan. Most of Central Asia and the western Eurasian steppe was almost completely Turkified. However, in most of the southern regions, corresponding to the Iranian Plateau and mountains, more densely populated, Iranian peoples continued to be most of the population and remained so until modern times.

Various Persian empires flourished throughout Antiquity, however, they fell to the Islamic conquest in the 7th century, although other Persian empires formed again later.

Ancestors

Proto-Indo-Europeans (Proto-Indo-European speakers)
Proto-Indo-Iranians (common ancestors of the Iranian, Nuristani and Indo-Aryan peoples) (Proto-Indo-Iranian speakers)
Proto-Iranians (Proto-Iranian speakers)

Ancient Iranian Peoples

Mentioned in the Avesta
Airyas
Ahiryas
Dahis (possible ancestors of the Dahae or Dasa)
Sainus
Sairimas
Tuiryas
Turanians - an ancient Iranian ethnic group, their land was called Turan, a word that later was applied to the lands north of Iran and the Iranian Plateau and mountains, i.e. all Central Asia (including Transoxiana). (in the Avesta "Turan" had the meaning of an Iranian tribe, only later the name had the meaning of lands inhabited by Turkic tribes).
Yashtians

East Iranians

Northeast Iranians (Northern East Iranians)

Saka / Sacans (Sakā) / Scytho-Sarmatians - Sarmatians and Scythians, Scythian cultures peoples of the Western (or Ponto-Caspian steppe), Central (or Kazakh steppe) Eurasian steppe and Central Asia that spoke several Scytho-Sarmatian Iranian languages and had a kin and similar culture. The name Sakā was an Old Persian generic word for all Iranian speaking peoples, Scythians, Sarmatians and others, that lived in the Eurasian Steppe and were nomad or semi nomadic pastoralists/herders)
Western Saka (Western Scytho-Sarmatians) (Scythians in a narrow sense - the Scythian culture peoples that lived in the Ponto-Caspian steppe, the west part of the Eurasian Steppe)
Scythians / Scoloti (Skolotoí / Saka) (Sakā para Draya - "Sakas Beyond the Sea" - The Sea was the Pontus Euxinus / Black Sea) (the Old Persian word "Saka" covered both Scythians and Sarmatians)
Achaei (Acae)
Agavi Scythae
Core Scythians
Arpoxaians-Colaxaians-Lipoxaians
Arpoxaians (descendants of Arpoxais, possible eponym)
Catiari / Katiaroi
Traspies
Colaxaians (descendants of Colaxais, possible eponym)
Paralatae / Royal Scythians
Spalaei / Spali / Palaei / Pali 
Lipoxaians (descendants of Lipoxais, possible eponym)
Auchetae / Euchatae
Asampatae 
Athernei
Hamaxobii
Lower Danube Scythians (a small tribal group of Scythians that took refuge in the areas of today's Dobrogea)
Crimean Scythians (a small tribal group of Scythians that took refuge in the areas of today's Crimea)
Tauri Scythae / Tauroscythae, Tauri Scythians or Scythianized Tauri, they lived in the plains of Northern Taurica or Tauris Peninsula (today called Crimea)
Eastern Saka (Eastern Scytho-Sarmatians) (Scythians in the broad sense of Scythian culture peoples) (in a narrow sense, Eastern Saka refers to the Iranian nomadic or seminomadic pastoralist peoples that lived in the central part of the Eurasian steppe or Kazakh steppe and Central Asia, they were called "Sarmatians" by the Greeks and "Saka" by the Persians) (the Old Persian word "Saka" covered both Scythians and Sarmatians)
Central Asian Sakas / Central Asia Scytho-Sarmatians
Core Central Asian Sakas / Core Central Asian Scytho-Sarmatians
Amyrgians (Sakā haumavargā - Soma Drinkers/Gatherers Sakas) (Sakā para Sugudam - Sakas Beyond Sogdiana, may have been the same as the Sakā haumavargā i.e. the Amyrgians, the Greek name for the same people) (roughly in today's Ferghana Valley and basin, parts of Uzbekistan, Tadjikistan and Kyrghyzstan)
Anaraci
Aspisi / Aspisii
Cachassae
Chauranaci
Southwest Central Asian Sakas / Southwest Central Asian Scytho-Sarmatians
Dahae-Amardi
Dahae / Dahas / Dasa
Parni / Aparni (tribe where Arsaces I became chief, later he became the first king of Parthia, he was the founder of the Arsacid Dynasty, that ruled the Parthian Empire; several ancient authors said he was of Scythian or Bactrian origin)
Pissuri
Xanthii
Amardians / Mardians (initially they lived in Southwest Central Asia, however they migrated southwest towards central Alborz Mountains and plains of southern Caspian Sea coast and later they became assimilated into Northwestern Iranians subgroup of Western Iranians)
Tapurians / Tapuri / Tapuraei (initially they lived in Southwest Central Asia, however they migrated southwest toward Tapuria, in the east Alborz Mountains and plains of the southeastern Caspian Sea coast, and later they became assimilated into Northwestern Iranians subgroup of Western Iranians) (origin of the name Tapuristan or Tabaristan, the land where they went living)
Massagetae / Orthocorybantians (Sakā tigraxaudā - Pointy Hoods / Pointed Hats Sakas or Scythians) (Massagetae and Sakā Tigraxaudā or Orthocorybantians, as they were known by the Greeks, may have been different names for the same people)
Apasiacae
Iaxartae (they lived along the Iaxartes river banks (modern Syr Darya)
Norossi
Tectosaces (not to be confused with the Celtic Tectosages)
Sakas (in a modern narrow sense the northernmost and easternmost Scytho-Sarmatians, including those who lived in the Tarim Basin, where Tocharians also dwelt)
Scytho-Siberians (in southern West Siberia and northern Kazakhstan, in the upper Irtysh, Ishim, Tobol and Ob' river courses regions)
Abii / Gabii
Altay-Sayan Sakas / Altay-Sayan Scythians / Altay-Sayan Scytho-Sarmatians (they were part of the Scythian cultures ethnic and linguistic continuum; they lived in the Altay and western slopes of the Sayan Mountains and possibly they were the people that formed the Pazyryk culture) (possibly they conquered or expelled the older Afanasievo culture people, which were possibly descendant from the Proto-Tocharians) (there is the strong possibility that Proto-Turkics were influenced by the Altay-Sayan Sakas and vice versa and also to a possibility of an ethnic mixing in this region between larger West Eurasian and East Eurasian populations)
Galactophagi ("Milk Drinkers" / "Milk Eaters") (real or legendary people)
Galactopotae (real or legendary people)
Hippemolgi ("Mare-Milkers") (real or legendary people)
Hippophagi ("Horse Eaters") (real or legendary people)
Thyssagetae
Sacaralae (Eastern Central Asia Saka) (roughly in today's central and eastern Kazakhstan) - they lived in the Chu and Sarysu river basins and their desert areas, and in the Ili river and Lake Balkash basin and most part of the Tian Shan mountains northern slope (also known as Tengri Tagh or Tengir-Too mountains).
Tarim Basin Sakas (mainly in the western and southern regions)
Gumo Sakas / Tumshuq Sakas (they lived in today's Tumshuq region and city) (they spoke Tumshuqese or Tumshuqese Saka, a Northeast Iranian language or dialect)
Kashgar Sakas (they lived in Kashgar city and region)
Khotan Sakas (they lived in the Khotan region, known as Gaustana in Sanskrit and Prakrit texts) (they spoke Khotanese or Khotanese Saka, a Northeast Iranian language or dialect)
Indo-Scythians / Indo-Sakas (a group of Sakas that migrated towards East Iranian Plateau, Indus valley and India)
Sarmatians Proper / Sauromatae 
Aorsi-Alans (two closely related Sarmatian tribes or the same tribe known by different names)
Aorsi (they lived northeast of the Siraces) (Yancai or Yentsai was the Chinese name of a State that could be identical with an Aorsi one)
Lower Aorsi (Western Aorsi)
Upper Aorsi (Eastern Aorsi) (from northern Caspian Sea coast to the northern Aral Sea coast) (identical with the Alans?)
Alans (a closely related people or tribe with the Aorsi Sarmatians or the same people known by two different names) (Aryan > *Alyan > Alan) (Ossetians / Irættæ are a modern branch) (also called "Melanchlaeni" - "Black-Cloaks", not to be confused with other two peoples called by that same name that were: the "Melanchlaeni" - "Black-Cloaks" of Pontus, and the "Melanchlaeni" - "Black-Cloaks" of the far north)
Iasi (Iasi / Jassi / Jasz are descendants from a group of Alans that migrated westward, they are related but not identical to the oldest Iazyges)
Roxolani (an offshoot and eastern branch of the Alans)
Banat Roxolani (a branch of the Roxolani that migrated westward)
Agaragantes / Arcaragantes (Free Sarmatians)
Cissianti
Iazyges / Iazyges Metanastae / Iaxamatae 
Khorouathoi / Choruathi / Haravati (their name may have influenced the ethnonym of the Croats but are not necessarily their ancestors or of most of them)
Phoristae
Rhymnici, they dwelt along Rha river banks (today's Volga) in the steppe area (the adjective seems to derive from the name "Rha" or "Rā", the Scythian name for the Volga river) (Oares was the Greek name for this river)
Rimphaces
Serboi (their name may have influenced the ethnonym of the Serbs but are not necessarily their ancestors or of most of them)
Siraci / Siraces
Spondolici
Urgi

Southeast Iranians (Southern East Iranians)

Arachosians / Arachoti
Eoritae
Musarnaei
Pactyans / Pakthas (possible ancestors of the Pakhtuns / Pashtuns) The Greek historian Herodotus mentioned a people called Pactyan living on the eastern frontier of the Achaemenid Arachosia Satrapy as early as the 1st millennium BCE.
Par(g)yetae
Rhoplutae
Sidri
Arians Proper / Arii
Borgi
Casirotae
Ariaspae / Evergetae
Bactrians
Chomari
Comi 
Drepsiani
Oxiani
Parsii
Salatarae
Trybactae
Zariaspae
Chorasmians / Khwarezmians
Drangians / Drangae / Zarangians / Zarangae 
Gedrosians / Gedrosii / Gedroseni
Aparytae
Arabitae / Arbies
Iranian Ichthyophagi / Iranian Ichthyophagoi (Iranian Fish-Eaters)
Oritae
Paricanians / Paricanii / Oreitae / Orae (from Old Persian Barikânu - Mountain people)
Rhamnae
Margians
Drachamae
Mycae
Sogdians - the people that lived in Sogdiana, possible ancestors of the Yaghnobis (Kangju – Chinese name of a State probably identical to the Sogdians)

West Iranians

Northwest Iranians (Northern West Iranians)
Aenianes
Astabeni
Carduchi / Corduchi / Cyrtaei / Cyrtii (mentioned by Strabo, and possible ancestors of the Kurds according to Muhammad Dandamayev) (See "Carduchi" in Encyclopædia Iranica)
Derbiccans / Derbiccae / Derbices (oldest inhabitants of the land later known as Tapuristan or Tabaristan and part of Hyrcania before the arrival of the Tapures or Tapuri)
Dribyces
Gelae / Gilites (possible ancestors of the Gilaks), although associate they were not the same people as the Cadusii
Hyrcani, they lived in Hyrcania
Medes
Arizanti
Budii
Busae
Magi (Median tribe from where, over time, many of the Zoroastrian priests came, it was a priestly tribe for the Zoroastrian religion, somehow similar to the role Levites, from the Tribe of Levi, had in Judaism, the religion of the ancient Hebrews, Jews or Israelites)
Paraetaceni / Paraetacae / Paraetaci
Sidices
Struchates
Vaddasi
Parthians
Nisaei (in the region of Nisa, first capital of the Parthians, Parthia)
Seven Parthian clans (Seven Great Houses of Iran) (tribe of seven clans) - Ispahbudhan /  Aspahbadh (seat was in Gurgan), Karen / Karen-Pahlavi (Kārēn-Pahlaw) (seat was in Nahavand), Mihran / Mehrān (seat was in Ray), Spandiyadh / Spendiad / Isfandiyar (seat was in Ray), Suren (seat was in Sakastan or Sistan, ancient Zaranka, Zranka or Drangiana), Varaz (seat was in Eastern Khorasan), Zik (seat was in Adurbadagan or Aturpatakan, called Atropatene by the Greeks, today's modern Iranian Azerbaijan) ("House" was synonym of "Clan")
Indo-Parthians / Suren Parthians (origin in the Suren Parthians)
Vitii

Southwest Iranians (Southern West Iranians)
Carmanians / Garmanians (Carmani / Garmani) / Germani / Germanii (a variant of Carmani, i.e. Carmanians, not to be confused with the Germanic peoples of Europe, that were also Indo-European peoples but from another branch or subfamily)
Arae
Chudi
Isatichae
Proto-Persians (Parsua / Parsumash)
Persians
Dai
Derusiaei
Dropici
Maraphii (one of the three main and leading ancient Persian tribes)
Mardi / Southern Mardi 
Maspii (one of the three main and leading ancient Persian tribes)
Panthialaei
Pasargadae (one of the three main and leading ancient Persian tribes, this was the tribe that contained the clan of the Achaemenids, House of Achaemenes, from which Cyrus the Great, founder of the Persian Empire, was a member) ("House" was synonym of "Clan") (Pasargadae, the first capital of the Persian Achaemenid Empire, was in the land of this tribe and took its name from them)
Pateischoreis
Rhapses
Sagartians / Asagartians (their exact location is unknown; according to Herodotus (1.125, 7.85) they were related to the Ancient Persians, which dwelt in southwestern Iran and spoke a southwestern Iranian language) (there is the possibility, by phonetic change, that their name survives in the name of the Zagros Mountains if they were identical to the Zikirti; there is also the possibility that they dwelt in northeastern Iran, south of the Parthians, and not in the Zagros mountains)
Sassanians (tribe that contained the clan of the House of Sasan, that gave the name to the tribe, from which Ardashir I, founder of the Sassanian Empire, was a member) ("House" was synonym of "Clan")
Soxotae
Stabaei
Suzaei
Utians

Ancient peoples of uncertain origin with possible Iranian background or partially Iranian

Mainly Iranian Background
Iranian Huns (Xwn / Xyon / Hunas) (mostly Iranian descendants from the nomadic Sakas, although many in the ruling class may have been Xunyu or Xiongnu Turkic in origin and related to the Huns or Western Huns that invaded many parts of the Western Eurasian steppe and Late Antiquity Europe)
Nezak Huns
Red Huns / Kermichiones (Red = Southern)
Alchon Huns / Alchono Huns
Kidarites /  Kermichiones (Karmir Xyon)
White Huns (Spet Xyon / Sveta Huna) (White = Western) 
Hephthalites / Uar (Ebodalo)
Xionites / Chionites / Chionitae

Iranians mixed with other non-Iranian peoples

Dacian-Iranian
Agathyrsi
Tyragetae (may have been a mixed Daco-Getae - Iranian people, or just a Dacian-Getae people or tribe and not an Iranian one)

Greek-Iranian
Gelonians / Geloni (Helonians / Heloni), people of partially Greek and partially Scythian descent.

Northwest Caucasian-Iranian
Maeotians, a group of peoples that dwelt in the Maeotian Lake (Azov Sea) and Palus Maeotis (Don river delta swamps) that may have been Cimmerians, Iranian people (Scythians), West Caucasian people (Circassians / Adyghe) with an Iranian overlordship or a mixture of Iranian and West Caucasian peoples
Agri 
Arrechi
Aspurgiani
Dandarii
Dosci
Ixomates
Obidiaceni
Sindi / Sindes / Sindones / Sindianoi
Sittaceni
Tarpetes
Toreatae

Slavic-Iranian
Antes, may have been a Slavic people and not an Iranian one or a mixed Iranian and Slavic people.

Thracian-Iranian
Cimmerians, they could have been a people of Thracian-Dacian origin with an Iranian overlordship, a mixture of Thracians and Iranians or a missing link between Indo-Iranian peoples and Thracians and Dacians.

Mixed peoples that had some Iranian component

Celtic-Germanic-Iranian
Bastarnae, an ancient people who between 200 BC and 300 AD inhabited the region between the Carpathian Mountains and the river Dnieper, to the north and east of ancient Dacia - one possible origin of the name is from Avestan and Old Persian cognate bast- "bound, tied; slave" (cf. Ossetic bættən "bind", bast "bound") and Proto-Iranian *arna- "offspring")
Atmoni / Atmoli
Peucini / Peucini Bastarnae (a branch of the Bastarnae that lived in the region north of the Danube Delta)
Sidoni / Sidones

Possible Iranian or Non-Iranian peoples

Iranian or other Indo-European peoples

Iranian or Anatolian (Indo-European)
Cappadocians or Leucosyri (White Syrians) (a possible Anatolian Indo-European people and not an Iranian one)

Iranian or Germanic
Taifals (Taifali / Taifalae)

Iranian or Indo-Aryan
Dadicae / Daradai / Daradas (Darada > Darda > Dard?) (may have been possible ancestors of the Dards, an Indo-Aryan people, and not an Iranian one), they dwelt in the region of the upper course of the Indus, in modern Khyber Pakhtunkhwa, Gilgit area of the modern Gilgit-Baltistan, both in Pakistan and also in Kashmir Valley and Chenab Valley in India.
Sattagydans, people that dwelt in Sattagydia (Old Persian Thataguš; th = θ, from θata - "hundred" and guš - "cows", country of the People of "Hundred Cows"), may have been an Iranian people of Sindh with Indo-Aryan influence or the opposite, an Indo-Aryan people of Sindh with Iranian influence.
Sogdi (Sogdoí), people that inhabited where today is the Sibi Division valley in Balochistan, between Balochistan and Sindh, and most of the Larkana Division, and parts of the Sukkur Division to the west of the Indus river, in Sindh, their main city was called Sogdorum Regia (maybe today's Sukkur) by the ancient Greek and Roman authors, and was on the Indus river banks. They may have been, as the name could tell, a branch of the Sogdians, the "Indus Sogdians", in a region of the west Indus valley or they also may have been an Indo-Aryan people of the Indus valley with a coincidental name with the Sogdians.
Shakya - a clan of Iron age India (1st millennium BCE), habitating an area in Greater Magadha, on the foothills of the Himalaya mountains. Some scholars argue that the Shakya were of Scythian (Saka) origin and assimilated into Indo-Aryan peoples. Siddhartha Gautama (also known as Buddha or Shakyamuni - Sage of the Shakyas) (c. 6th to 4th centuries BCE), whose teachings became the foundation of Buddhism, was the best-known Shakya.

Iranian or Nuristani
Kambojas / Komedes / Kapisi / Rishikas / Tambyzoi / Ambautae - a people that lived in a country called Kumuda, probably in what is now part of Afghanistan. There are different views among scholars about their ethnic and linguistic kinship. According to some they are possible ancestors of Pamir peoples in the Pamir Mountains, roughly Badakhshan region of Tajikistan and Afghanistan and parts of the Hindu Kush or Paropamisus in east central Afghanistan and northwestern Pakistan) According to other scholars they were an old transitional people between Iranian and Indo-Aryan peoples and as such they may have been the ancestors of the Nuristani people (until the end of the 19th century they were known as Kafirs because they were not Muslims, and practiced an ancient Indo-Iranian religion like today the Kalash people). In Antiquity, one of the regions that they dwelt was in the southern and eastern slopes of the Paropamisus Mountains (today's Hindu Kush in east central Afghanistan and northwestern Pakistan)
Ambautae
Ashvakas / Assacenii / Assacani / Aspasii (Aspasians): A few scholars have linked the historical Afghans (modern Pakhtuns/Pashtuns) to the Ashvakas (the Ashvakayanas and Ashvayanas of Pāṇini or the Assakenoi and Aspasio of Arrian). The name Afghan is said to have derived from the Ashvakan of Sanskrit texts. Ashvakas are identified as a branch of the Kambojas. This people was known, by Greek and Roman authors, as Assakanoi and Assacani. The similarity of the name Assacani with the name Sacae/Sacans/Sakas made that the two peoples were confused by Greeks and Romans (as is shown in map 11 regarding the Pamir mountains on the upper right edge). However the Pamir mountains were dwelt by the Asvaka Kambojas and not by the Sacans although they were related peoples (they were both East Iranians, however the Asvaka Kambojas were or Southeast Iranians or ancestors of the Nuristani while the Sacans/Sakas, Scythians or Sarmatians, were Northeast Iranians).
Apracharajas
Cabolitae, in the region of Kabul (today's capital of Afghanistan), part of the old Kingdom of Kapisa
Indo-Kambojas
Western Kambojas (spread and scattered in Sindhu, Saurashtra, Malwa, Rajasthan, Punjab and Surasena)
Eastern Kambojas (some formed the Kamboja-Pala Dynasty of Bengal)
Parama Kambojas, Kumuda or Komedes, of the Alay Valley or Alay Mountains, north of Hindukush / Paropamisus in today's far southern Kyrgyzstan and far northern Tajikistan. They formed the Parama Kamboja Kingdom. In ancient Sanskrit texts, their territory was known as Kumudadvipa and it formed the southern tip of the Sakadvipa or Scythia. In classical literature, this people are known as Komedes. Indian epic Mahabharata designates them as Parama Kambojas
Homodotes
Rishikas, some historians believe the Rishikas were a part of, or synonymous with, the Kambojas. However, there are other theories regarding their origins.
Tambyzi / Tambyzoi

Iranian or Slavs
Limigantes (may have been a non-Sarmatian subject people - slaves or serfs of the Sarmatians, some scholars think they were Slavs)

Iranian or Thracian
Sigynnae

Iranian or Thracian-Iranian (Cimmerian) or Northwest Caucasian
Tauri, they lived in the mountains of Southern Taurica or Tauris Peninsula (today's Crimea); non scythianized Tauri.
Arichi
Napaei
Sinchi

Iranian or Tocharian
There are different or conflicting views among scholars regarding the ethnic and linguistic kinship of the peoples known by the Han Chinese as Wusun and Yuezhi and also other less known peoples (a minority of scholars argue that they were Tocharians, based, among other things, on the similarity of names like "Kushan" and the native name of "Kucha" (Kuśi) and the native name "Kuśi" and Chinese name "Gushi" or the name "Arsi" and "Asii", however most scholars argue that they were possibly Northeastern Iranian peoples)
Argippaei
Asii / Issedones / Wusun (may have been the same people called by different exonym names)
Asii / Asioi / Osii, an ancient Indo-European people of Central Asia, during the 2nd and 1st Centuries BCE, known only from Classical Greek and Roman sources.
Issedones, people that lived north and northeast of the Sarmatians and Scythians in Western Siberia or Chinese Turkestan (Xinjiang) (may have been the same people as the Asii or Asioi).
Wusun - some speculate that they were the same as the Issedones / Essedones
Gushi or Jushi or Gushineans (an obscure ancient people that lived in two regions: in the Turpan Basin, i.e. Chinese Jushi or Gushi, including Khocho or Qočo, known in Chinese as Gaochang; and also in a large northern region, roughly in many parts of the region later known as Dzungaria, south of the Altay Mountains; they were the basis of the Gushi or Jushi Kingdom. They spoke a language that eventually diverged into two dialects, as noted by diplomats from the Han empire) (they may have been one of the peoples misnamed "Tocharians", speakers of Tocharian A?) (there are different views among scholars about their ethnic and linguistic kinship)
Nearer Gushi / Anterior Gushi, in the Turpan Basin
Further Gushi / Posterior Gushi, the region north of the Turpan Basin, 10 km north of Jimasa, 200 km north of Jiaohe, roughly in Dzungaria.
Yuezhi / Gara? (an ancient Indo-European speaking people, in the western areas of the modern Chinese province of Gansu, during the 1st millennium BC, or in Dunhong, in the Tian Shan, later they migrated westward and southward into south Central Asia, in contact and conflict with the Sogdians and Bactrians, and they possibly were the people called by the name Tocharians or Tukhara, which was possibly an Iranian speaking people not to be confused with another people misnamed or not as "Tocharians") (according to the Iranian historian Jahanshah Derakhshani the Kochi or Kuchi people, a group of nomadic Ghilji or Ghilzai Pakhtun, are descendants from the Yuezhi that were assimilated into the Pakhtun, the name derives from Guci, formerly Chinese: 月氏; pinyin: Yuèzhī)
Greater-Yuezhi (Tu Gara?) (Dà Yuèzhī – 大月氏) (Tu Gara > Tu Kara? > Tu Khara?) Possibly the Iranian Tocharians (not to be confused with the peoples called "Tocharians" in a misnomer) (possibly they were the ancestors of the Kushans)
Tusharas (Tukharas?), could have been identical with the Greater-Yuezhi, the greater part of Yuezhi, are the people that migrated from western Gansu and after from the Ili Valley, migrated southward and settled in Tukhara, another name for Bactria after the invasion of the Iranian Tocharians that came from the north and northeast (not to be confused with the peoples mistakenly called "Tocharians" which were of another Indo-European branch of peoples)
Kushans (Chinese: 貴霜; pinyin: Guìshuāng), they were the basis of the Kushan Empire)
Lesser-Yuezhi (Xiǎo Yuèzhī – 小月氏)

Iranian, Tocharian or Turkic
Ordos culture people (in the Upper or North Ordos Plateau or the Ordos Desert) (if ancient Indo-European, they would have been the easternmost people) (they may have been a people closely related to the Yuezhi)

Iranian or Non-Indo-European peoples

Iranian or Northeast Caucasian
Cadusii, warlike people living just north of Medes with possible Iranian or Caucasian origin.
Caspians, were a people of antiquity who dwelt along the southern and southwestern shores of the Caspian Sea, in the region known as Caspiane.

Iranian or Turkic
Xiongnu (ruling class) The Xiongnu could also be synonymous with the Huns, that are assumed to be a Turkic people, although there is not certainty or consensus about this matter.

Iranian or Ugric
Iyrcae / Iyrkai, people that lived northeast of the Thyssagetae, they dwelt in far southwestern Siberia, in the upper basins of the Tobol and the Irtysh rivers, possibly they are the ancestors of the Ugrian peoples, Khanty and Mansi and the more distantly related Magyars (Hungarians), they are speakers of Uralic languages and not Iranian. These peoples were collectively called Yugra, where the adjective "Ugric" comes from (possible phonetic change: *Iurka > *Iukra > *Iugra > Jugra or Yugra; J = English Y; u or ü, Ancient Greek y = ü). They were culturally influenced by ancient Iranian peoples (including language borrowings). The name "Iyrcae" sometimes was wrongly spelt as "Tyrcae" "(Türkai)" by ancient authors (like Pliny the Elder and Pomponius Mela) but there is no connection to the Turkic peoples (Turks).

Semi-legendary peoples (inspired by real Iranian peoples)

Amazons-Gargareans
Amazons, a semi-legendary people or tribe of women warriors (an all-female tribe) that Greek authors such as Herodotus and Strabo said to be related to the Scythians and the Sarmatians, however, there could be some historical background for a real people with Iranian etymology (*ha-mazan- "warriors") that lived in Scythia and Sarmatia, but later became the subject of wild exaggerations and myths. Ancient authors said that they guaranteed their continuity through reproduction with the Gargareans (an all-male tribe).
Gargareans, a semi-legendary people or tribe only formed by men (an all-male tribe), however, there could be some historical background for a real people, but later became the subject of wild exaggerations and myths. Ancient authors said that they guaranteed their continuity through reproduction with the Amazons (an all-female tribe).

Arimaspae
Arimaspae / Arimaspi / Arimphaei / Riphaeans, they lived north of the Scythians in the southeast foothills of the Riphean Mountains (Ural Mountains?), although a semi-legendary people or tribe there could be some historical background for a real people with Iranian etymology (Ariama: love, and Aspa: horses) that lived in that region but they were later turned as base for a myth, especially for the one-eyed beings that fought with the griffins.

See also 
 Iranian peoples
 Iranian languages
 List of ancient Indo-Aryan peoples and tribes
 List of Rigvedic tribes
 List of ancient Greek tribes
 List of ancient Germanic peoples and tribes
 List of ancient Slavic peoples and tribes
 List of ancient Celtic peoples and tribes
 List of ancient Italic peoples

References

Literature 
 H. Bailey, "ARYA: Philology of ethnic epithet of Iranian people", in Encyclopædia Iranica, v, pp. 681–683, Online-Edition, Link
 A. Shapur Shahbazi, "Iraj: the eponymous hero of the Iranians in their traditional history" in Encyclopædia Iranica, Online-Edition, Link
 R. Curzon, "The Iranian Peoples of the Caucasus", 
 Jahanshah Derakhshani, "Die Arier in den nahöstlichen Quellen des 3. und 2. Jahrtausends v. Chr.", 2nd edition, 1999,  ("The Arians in the Middle Eastern sources of the 3rd and 2nd Millennia BC")
 Richard Frye, "Persia", Zurich, 1963
 Wei Lan-Hai; Li Hui; Xu Wenkan (2013). "The separate origins of the Tocharians and the Yuezhi: Results from recent advances in archaeology and genetics" in Research Gate

External links
 - Source texts of ancient Greek and Roman authors
 - Strabo's work The Geography (Geographica). Book 11, Chapters 6 to 13, and Book 15, Chapters 2 and 3, are about regions dwelt by ancient Iranian peoples and tribes (each region has a chapter).
List of Globally Famous People of Iran (M.I.T)

 
Lists of ancient Indo-European peoples and tribes
Iranian